Marco Tronchetti Provera (born 1948) is an Italian businessman. He was the chief executive officer of Pirelli & C. S.p.A. from 1992 to 2022 and its executive vice chairman since October 20, 2015. He is the chairman of Marco Tronchetti, Provera & C. S.p.A., a holding that he controls and which indirectly holds 50% of Camfin S.p.A. (where he was Chairman until December 2013). Camfin indirectly holds 41% of Marco Polo Industrial Holding S.p.A., the major shareholder who controls Pirelli & C. S.p.A.

Biography 

Provera was born in Milan in 1948. He obtained a degree in Economics and Business Administration from the Bocconi University of Milan in 1971. He entered the Pirelli Group in 1986. He married Cecilia Pirelli, the daughter of the company founder Leopoldo Pirelli, in 1987. He took over the operational control of the group in 1992.

In 2001, he acquired a controlling stake of Telecom Italia's main holding, became chairman of the company,  and attempted to sell it to the Mexican telecom mogul Carlos Slim.

In 2015, he led the 7-billion dollar takeover of China National Chemical Corporation on Pirelli. He negotiated to remain executive vice-chairman and CEO of the tire company. In May 2022, he stepped down as CEO of Pirelli but remained the executive vice-chairman.

Other roles 

 Since September 2020: Member of the Italian Aspen Institute.
 Deputy chairman of the Board of Mediobanca
 Member of the executive committee of Confindustria
 Member of the International Advisory Board of insurance company Allianz
 Member of the Steering Committee of Assonime and of Assolombarda.
 Honorary co-chairman for the Italian branch of the Council for the United States and Italy
 Member of the Italian Group of the Trilateral Commission.
 December 1996-September 2005: Chairman of Il Sole 24 Ore
 October 2001-September 2005: Board member of Milan's La Scala opera house
 September 2001-September 2006: Chairman of Telecom Italia S.p.A

Personal life 
He has been married to the journalist Letizia Rittatore Vonwiller. He then married Cecilia Pirelli in 1987, with whom he had three children. In December 2001, he married Afef Jnifen. They announced their divorce in 2018.

References

Bocconi University alumni
Italian businesspeople
Living people
Tire industry people
Pirelli people
1948 births